Indicator is a genus of  near passerine birds in the honeyguide family. The name refers to the behaviour of some species, notably the greater honeyguide, which guide humans to bee colonies so that they can share in the spoils of wax and insects when the nest is broken into.

Indicator honeyguides are brood parasites which lay eggs in a nest of another species, in a series of about five during five to seven days.  Most favour hole-nesting species, often the related barbets and woodpeckers. Nestlings have been known to physically eject their host's chicks from the nest, and they have hooks on their beaks with which they puncture the hosts' eggs or kill the nestlings, by repeated lacerations if not a fatal stab.

Species
The species in genus Indicator, in taxonomic order, are:

References

 

 
Honeyguides
Bird genera